Cuisinart is an American popular home appliance brand which is owned by Conair Corporation. The company was started in 1971 by Carl Sontheimer to bring an electric food processor to the U.S. market. The "Food Processor" was the first model, introduced at a food show in Chicago in 1973. The name "Cuisinart" became synonymous with "food processor." It is also a portmanteau of "cuisine" and "art."

Cuisinart became the property of Conair Corporation in 1989.

History of Cuisinart 
Cuisinart was founded in 1971 by Carl Sontheimer, a graduate of Massachusetts Institute of Technology who was inspired by his love of French food. This led to the creation of Cuisinart and its main product, the food processor. Cuisinart introduced its brand in January 1973 at a trade show in Chicago. The success of Cuisinart was limited at first, until a review in Gourmet magazine helped to lift sales.

Throughout the mid-1970s, Cuisinart sales rose due to Cuisinart's association with celebrity chefs such as James Beard, a close friend of Carl Sontheimer. Cuisinart became an important product in universal design when it hired Marc Harrison to make Cuisinart's products accessible for everyone, including those with limited mobility or vision.

By the mid-to-late 1980s, Cuisinart incurred financial troubles and suffered from falling sales. A group of investors bought Sontheimer's interest in the company in 1987 for $42 million. In August 1989, the company filed for bankruptcy. This led to Conair buying the company for $27 million.

Legal troubles with Robot-Coupe
In the late 1970s a legal conflict between Robot-Coupe and Cuisinart developed when Robot-Coupe stopped distributing Cuisinart products and released the products under their own name. Robot-Coupe hired Alvin Fineman, Cuisinart's former marketing director in 1979, who engaged in competitive advertisements that resulted in a lawsuit. Robot-Coupe was ordered to stop insinuating that Cuisinart sold products manufactured by Robot-Coupe.

Products and innovations
A partial list of Cuisinart products includes:

 Air fryer
 Bakeware
 Handheld blenders
 Bread machine
 Countertop blenders
 Brick ovens
 Can opener
 Coffeemakers
 Coffee grinders
 Convection oven
 Cookware
 Cutlery
 Cutting boards
 Deep fryer
 Dutch oven
 Espresso maker
 Food processors
 Grills, griddles
 Hand mixers
 Ice cream and sorbet makers
 Juice extractor
 Kitchen tools and gadgets
 Kettle
 Microwave ovens
 Popcorn maker
 Raclettes
 Rice cookers
 Scales
 Slow cookers
 Speciality appliances
 Stand mixers
 Toasters
 Toaster oven broilers
 Waffle makers

The Cuisinart company's best-known product is the food processor. It also produced many other products. After Cuisinart hired industrial designer Marc Harrison in the 1970s to design many new products and improve other designs, many of the company's products became associated with universal design. Harrison made its products more functional for users with disabilities, designing larger fonts so that people with vision problems could see them.

References

Home appliance brands
Cooking appliance brands
American companies established in 1971
Electronics companies established in 1971
Manufacturing companies established in 1971
American brands
Home appliance manufacturers of the United States
Companies based in Stamford, Connecticut
Manufacturing companies based in Connecticut
Companies that filed for Chapter 11 bankruptcy in 1989
1989 mergers and acquisitions
Knife manufacturing companies